Tsaghkunyats Mountains (or Tsaghkunyats Ridge),  (Tsaghkunyats lernasheghta), are a range of mountains in Armenia, mainly in the provinces of Kotayk and Aragatsotn. 

The range is of volcanic origin including many extinct volcanoes. It has a length of 42 km, stretched between Pambak Mountains near the village of Mijnatun at the north, and the right bank of Hrazdan River to the southeast. The highest peak of the  Tsaghkunyats Mountains is Mount Teghenis near Tsaghkadzor, at 2851 meters. The range is formed by a volcanic field, containing Pleistocene-to-Holocene lava domes and cinder cones.

The area is a popular mountain resort with its spa towns and villages, including Tsaghkadzor, Hankavan, Bjni, Arzakan and Aghveran.

Gallery

See also
 List of volcanoes in Armenia

References

Volcanic fields
Lava domes
Cinder cones
Mountain ranges of Armenia